Anara Naeem is an Islamic scholar of Maldives. She was a Member of Parliament for Makunudhoo constituency from 2014 to 2019 as a member of the Adhaalath Party. 

Naeem has a bachelor's degree in Sharia and Law from University of Qatar.  She was the only member of the Adhaalath Party who won a seat in Parliament in 2014.  She announced her departure from the party in December 2021.

References

Living people
21st-century Maldivian women politicians
21st-century Maldivian politicians
Adhaalath Party politicians
Year of birth missing (living people)
Qatar University alumni